The Hornblende Bluffs are prominent bluffs that rise to , located  southeast of Mount Ellery and near the head of Suvorov Glacier, in the Wilson Hills of Antarctica. The feature was so named by the northern party of the New Zealand Geological Survey Antarctic Expedition, 1963–64, who found the rock here contains the mineral hornblende.

See also
Heth Ridge

References

Cliffs of Oates Land